Majdany may refer to several places:
Majdany, Kuyavian-Pomeranian Voivodeship (north-central Poland)
Majdany, Kutno County in Łódź Voivodeship (central Poland)
Majdany, Piotrków County in Łódź Voivodeship (central Poland)
Majdany, Lublin Voivodeship (east Poland)
Majdany, Masovian Voivodeship (east-central Poland)
Majdany, Koło County in Greater Poland Voivodeship (west-central Poland)
Majdany, Konin County in Greater Poland Voivodeship (west-central Poland)
Majdany, Środa Wielkopolska County in Greater Poland Voivodeship (west-central Poland)
Majdany, Pomeranian Voivodeship (north Poland)
 Majdany Małe
 Majdany Wielkie